The S22 was a railway service of RER Vaud that provided rush-hour service between  and  in the Swiss canton of Vaud. Swiss Federal Railways, the national railway company of Switzerland, operated the service.

Operations 
The S22 operated two trains in each direction per day.

History 
SBB introduced the S22 with the December 2020 timetable change. The RER Vaud lines were substantially reorganized for the December 2022 timetable change.

References

External links 
 
 2022 timetable

RER Vaud lines
Transport in the canton of Vaud